The R132 road is one of Ireland's newest regional roads, having been classified following the opening M1 motorway which by-passes most of the old N1 route. 

By-passed sections of the old N1 were reclassified R132. The route has a highly varying road quality, with some sections of dual carriageway such as the original Swords Bypass, and the original run-in to the M1 Balbriggan Bypass; much wide standard two-lane road, and some very poor segments.

Some sections, such as that through Drogheda, are still signed "N1" though the town was bypassed in 2003.

Route
The official description of the R132 from the Roads Act 1993 (Classification of Regional Roads) Order 2012  reads:

R132: Dublin — Dundalk, County Louth (Part Old National Route 1)

Between its junction with R803 at Parnell Street in the city of Dublin and its junction with R174 at Feede in the county of Louth via Parnell Square West, Granby Row, Dorset Street Upper (and via North Frederick Street, Parnell Square East and Cavendish Row), Dorset Street Lower, Drumcondra Road Lower, Drumcondra Road Upper and Swords Road (and via Shantalla Bridge) in the city of Dublin: Santry, Turnapin, Cloghran, Miltonsfields, Swords Demesne, Newtown, Lissenhall, Blake's Cross, Coldwinters, Courtlough and Balrothery; Dublin Street, The Square, Bridge Street and Drogheda Street in the town of Balbriggan; and Bremore in the county of Fingal: Knocknagin Bridge at the boundary between the county of Fingal and the county of Meath: Gormanston, Richardstown, Julianstown, Smithstown and Colp West in the county of Meath: Dublin Road, Dublin Gate, James Street, John Street, Rathmullen Road, Bridge of Peace, Georges Square, Georges Street and North Road in the borough of Drogheda: Moneymore, Newtown Monasterboice, Bawntaffe, Mullary Cross, Woodland, Dunleer, Cappoge, Kilsaran, Castlebellingham and Green Gates in the county of Louth: Marshes Upper, Inner Relief Road, Tain Bridge and Dowdallshill in the town of Dundalk: Faughart Lower, and Drumnasillagh, in the county of Louth

and

between its junction with N1 at Drumad in the county of Louth and the boundary between the county of Louth and the county of Armagh at Carrickarnan via Carrickarnan in the county of Louth.

Junction list

The junction list below only includes junctions with national or regional roads.

See also
Roads in Ireland
National primary road
National secondary road

References

External links
Roads Act 1993 (Classification of Regional Roads) Order 2006 – Department of Transport

Regional roads in the Republic of Ireland
Roads in County Meath
Roads in County Louth
Roads in Fingal
Roads in Swords, Dublin
Parnell Square